Tap Qaraqoyunlu is a village and municipality in the Goranboy District of Azerbaijan. It has a population of 2,415. The municipality consists of the villages of Tap Qaraqoyunlu and Tap.

Notable natives 

 Niyazi Aslanov — National Hero of Azerbaijan.

References 

Populated places in Goranboy District